Jabalpur Cantonment is a cantonment town in Jabalpur District in the Indian state of Madhya Pradesh.

Demographics
 India census, Jabalpur Cantonment had a population of 66,482. Males constitute 59% of the population and females 41%. Jabalpur Cantonment has an average literacy rate of 84%, higher than the national average of 59.5%: male literacy is 89%, and female literacy is 76%. In Jabalpur Cantonment, 10% of the population is under 6 years of age.

References

Cities and towns in Jabalpur district
Cantonments of British India
Cantonments of India